Siokovac  is a village in the municipality of Jagodina, Serbia. According to the 2002 census, the village has a population of 381 people.

Notable people
Radič Petrović (1738–1816), Serbian Revolutionary

References

Populated places in Pomoravlje District